TFO (Télévision française de l'Ontario) is a French-language public television channel in Ontario, Canada.

TFO may also refer to:

 Tandem Free Operation, in mobile telephony
 TCP Fast Open, in computer networking
 Tefaro language, by ISO 639-3 language code